Jose P. Laurel Highway is a , two-to-six lane, major highway running within the province of Batangas. The highway forms part of National Route 4 (N4) of the Philippine highway network. It is also known as Santo Tomas Bypass Road in Santo Tomas, Manila–Batangas Road from its junction with General Malvar Street in Santo Tomas southwards, and Ayala Highway in Lipa.

The highway was named in honor of José Paciano Laurel, who served as the president of the Second Philippine Republic. Laurel was born in Tanauan, Batangas, through which the highway traverses.

Route description 

Jose P. Laurel Highway starts at the Santo Tomas Junction, a roundabout intersection with the Maharlika Highway and Governor Carpio Avenue in Santo Tomas. It then enters Tanauan, Malvar, Lipa, where it diverts motorists around the poblacion as Ayala Highway, San Jose, and Batangas City, where it ends at Lawas Junction, its intersection with Palico–Balayan–Batangas Road and P. Burgos Street (Manila-Batangas Pier Road) in the poblacion. The Southern Tagalog Arterial Road mostly parallels the highway and crosses each other at Lipa and Batangas City.

History 
Most of the highway is historically called Manila–Batangas Road. It was designated as Highway 19 or Route 19, a route that linked Santo Tomas to the then-municipality of Batangas and was the logical continuation of Route 1 (Manila South Road), an old road from Manila that includes the present-day Maharlika Highway, prior to the completion of its section towards Alaminos, Laguna circa 1930s. New alignments bypassing the downtowns of San Jose, Lipa (now known as Ayala Highway), and Santo Tomas (officially known as Manila–Batangas Diversion Road), respectively, were later built and made part of the present-day Jose P. Laurel Highway.

Intersections

References

External links 
 Department of Public Works and Highways

Roads in Batangas